Donwun (also spelled Don Wun; also known as Wun), located 16km north of Thaton, is a former capital of Hanthawaddy. It was the capital for over five years between 1364 and 1369.

References

Bibliography
 
 

Old Cities of Mon people